The Many Facets of David Newman is an album by saxophonist David Newman featuring performances recorded in 1968 for the Atlantic label.

Reception

Allmusic awarded the album 3 stars stating "The Many Facets of David Newman is less poppish and more blues-oriented with the lengthy "Children of Abraham" showing some passion, but overall the material is rather weak and has not aged very well".

Track listing
All compositions by David Newman except as indicated
 "Shiloh" - 4:31
 "We're a Winner" (Curtis Mayfield) - 3:08
 "Children of Abraham" (William S. Fischer) - 10:08
 "Headstart" - 2:54
 "Chained No More" - 6:24
 "The Funky Way to Treat Somebody" (Calvin Arnold) - 3:07
 "Sylvia" (Henry Cosby, Sylvia Moy, Stevie Wonder) - 3:19
 "That's All" (Alan Brandt, Bob Haymes) - 6:10

Personnel 
David Newman - tenor saxophone, alto saxophone, flute
Melvin Lastie, Ernie Royal - trumpet (tracks 5 & 9)
Benny Powell - trombone (tracks 5 & 9)
Paul Ingraham, Julius Watkins - French horn (tracks 3, 5 & 8)
Jack Knitzer - oboe (tracks 5 & 9)
Paul Griffin (track 4), George Stubbs (tracks 2, 6 & 7), Joe Zawinul (tracks 1, 3, 5 & 8) - piano 
Billy Butler - guitar (tracks 2, 6 & 7)
Ron Carter (tracks 5 & 8), Richard Davis (tracks 1 & 3) - bass 
Chuck Rainey - electric bass (tracks 2, 4, 6 & 7)
Bruno Carr (tracks 1, 3, 5 & 8), Bernard Purdie (tracks 2, 4, 6 & 7) - drums
 Omar Clay - percussion (tracks 3, 5 & 8)
String section: Sanford Allen, Alfred Brown, Emanuel Green, Charles McCracken, Donald MacCourt, George Marge, Kermit Moore, Gene Orloff, George Ricci and Julius Schachter directed by Selwart Clarke (tracks 3, 5 & 8)

References 

1969 albums
David "Fathead" Newman albums
Albums produced by Joel Dorn
Atlantic Records albums